Godolphin is a Cornish aristocratic family name and may refer to:

Baron Godolphin, an English title of nobility
Earl of Godolphin, an English title of nobility
Godolphin and Latymer School, an independent school for girls in London (formerly the Godolphin School) 
Godolphin Arabian, an 18th-century racehorse owned by Francis Godolphin, 2nd Earl of Godolphin
Godolphin Cross, a village in Cornwall in England
Godolphin Estate, a National Trust property, and former seat of the Godolphin family, situated in Godolphin Cross, United Kingdom
Godolphin Ministry, the ministry of Sidney Godolphin, 1st Earl of Godolphin
Godolphin (racing), a thoroughbred racing stable
Godolphin School, an independent boarding school for girls in Salisbury in England
Godolphin (novel), a novel by Edward Bulwer-Lytton published in 1833 and revised in 1840

See also 
Francis Godolphin (disambiguation)
Sidney Godolphin (disambiguation)
William Godolphin (disambiguation)